Lyle & Scott Limited (Scottish Gaelic: Lyle & Scott Earranta), trading as Lyle & Scott, is a Scottish fashion and knitwear brand well known historically for its golfing knitwear. Based in Hawick, Scotland, the brand designs, manufactures and markets knitwear and in the 21st century has become increasingly popular for its clothing such as t-shirts, polo shirts, tracksuits and loungewear amongst younger and middle aged customers. 

Founded in 1874, the brand primarily focused on golfing attire for much of its history, sported by high-level golfers, and awarded a Royal Warrant of appointment by The Duke of Edinburgh in 1975. From 2004, the brand widened their appeal to a more mainstream audience, while retaining their golfing tradition.

History

Formation, 1874–2001
Lyle & Scott was founded in 1874 in the Scottish town of Hawick by William Lyle and Walter Scott with an £800 loan. The 125 year old Lyle & Scott archive of designers includes designs by Christian Dior and Michael Kors. 

The brand introduced its golf range in 1967, which was quickly adopted by top golfers such as Tony Jacklin, Gary Player and Greg Norman as well as golfing enthusiasts such as Bob Hope, Gareth Ford and Ronnie Corbett, with the latter usually sporting a Lyle & Scott jumper during his monologues on The Two Ronnies. Other patrons include Cristiano Ronaldo. Lyle and Scott were granted a Royal Warrant of appointment by The Duke of Edinburgh in 1975.

21st century, 2001–present 
In 2001, Lyle & Scott was acquired and had its headquarters moved to London. The rejuvenation of the brand can be traced back to 2003 with the launch of the ‘Vintage’ collection with its ‘Golden Eagle’ logo redesign and refreshed by London Designer, Alan Price. It was taken up by a selection of youth TV presenters and indie bands including the Arctic Monkeys. In 2005 following the success of the Vintage range, Lyle & Scott’s first stand-alone store opened in London’s Covent Garden on King Street.

In 2007, the Lyle & Scott Heritage collection was launched, with a more discrete, tonal logo. In early 2009 Lyle & Scott launched the ‘Club’ collection, a golf line aimed at the young golfer. 2009 also saw the launch of the Lyle & Scott e-commerce website, which offers the Lyle & Scott collections to purchase. In January 2011, the firm participated at The Brandery fashion show in Barcelona.

Notable patrons

Notable patrons include the Duke of Edinburgh, Prince Philip, Ronnie Corbett and musicians like the Arctic Monkeys, Kasabian, Pete Doherty, actor Adam Deacon as well as TV presenters Tim Lovejoy, Chris Ramsey, Simon Amstell and Holly Willoughby. Lyle and Scott has also featured in films such as The Firm and Green Street.

References

External links
 Lyle & Scott

Clothing brands
Scottish brands
British Royal Warrant holders
Knitwear manufacturers
Companies established in 1874
Clothing companies of Scotland